WRLH-TV (channel 35) is a television station in Richmond, Virginia, United States, affiliated with the Fox network. Owned by Sinclair Broadcast Group, it has studios on Westmoreland Street in the North Side area of Richmond, and its transmitter is based in Bon Air at the studios of PBS member stations WCVE-TV and WCVW.

History

Early history
WRLH began its operation on February 20, 1982. It was Richmond's first general entertainment independent station, and the first new commercial station in Richmond since WRVA-TV (channel 12, now WWBT) signed on 26 years earlier. It aired an analog signal on UHF channel 35 from a transmitter southwest of what is now the US 60/SR 288 interchange. It was the second station owned by the TVX Broadcast Group, who had launched WTVZ in Hampton Roads three years earlier. The WRLH call letters stand for Richmond and the two TVX executives primarily responsible for getting the station on the air, Gene Loving and Harvey Hudson. Like most independents, it initially offered a format consisting of cartoons, sitcoms, movies, drama shows, and religious programming in mid-mornings after the cartoons. WRLH also carried business news programming from the Financial News Network in the evenings until sign-off.

In 1984, WTLL signed on channel 63 with a religious format, and WRLH's religious programming moved there. Some of those shows moved back to WRLH when WTLL took on a general entertainment format in summer 1985 under a new call sign, WVRN-TV, and the two stations now competed under the same format. The competition took a toll financially, and as a result, TVX sold WRLH to the A. S. Abell Company of Baltimore (publisher of that city's Sun) in 1985 for $14.4 million, making it TVX's first divesture in history. Abell itself merged with Times Mirror the next year and for regulatory reasons, re-sold sold WRLH (along with WMAR-TV in Baltimore) to Gillett Broadcasting. Gillett then sold WRLH along with another station to Busse Broadcasting in 1987, again for regulatory reasons involving its own buyout of Storer Communications.

As a Fox affiliate
On October 9, 1986, WRLH became a charter Fox affiliate, with the affiliation agreement having been inherited from TVX ownership. The station is the only major station in Richmond to have never changed its network affiliation, having been with Fox since the network's inception.

WVRN was put up for sale after its parent company, Sudbrink Broadcasting, filed for Chapter 11 bankruptcy in late 1986. However, both stations continued to suffer financially. Part of the problem was that Fox only offered eight hours of programming a week at the time, meaning WRLH was still programmed largely as an independent. At the time, Richmond was not big enough to support what were essentially two independent stations. At different times, it offered to buy WRLH's programming on the condition that channel 35 itself be sold to a different group that would run it as a non-commercial or home shopping type station. Busse declined, but the company offered instead to sell WRLH outright to Act III Broadcasting in 1988, which then put WVRN back on the market. There were no takers for channel 63, however, and Act III acquired the programming assets of WVRN and merged the best of them onto WRLH's schedule, then took WVRN off the air and returned the channel 63 license to the Federal Communications Commission (FCC) for deletion. The sale was finalized on September 15, 1988.

The Act III group was purchased by Abry Communications in 1993. Sullivan Broadcasters (in which ABRY had a minority stake) took over the station in 1995, selling it to Sinclair in 1998. It began carrying a secondary UPN affiliation at the network's inception on January 16, 1995. This moved to WAWB (now WUPV-TV) in 1997. Also that year, WRLH began to carry programming from Kids' WB. Two years later, NBC affiliate WWBT started carrying WB programming out of rotation in late-night since there was no full-time affiliate with the network in Richmond. Gradually, the station began de-emphasizing its call letters except in legal IDs, referring to itself on-air as "Fox 35, Cable 5." In 2001, it rebranded as "Fox Richmond." A false WRLH newscast sporting the "Fox 35" logo is seen at the beginning of the 2001 film Hannibal, and the station has been shown as the Fox affiliate watched by the Smiths in the Fox/TBS series American Dad!.

On June 24, 2008, Sinclair announced that it was intending to purchase CBS affiliate WTVR-TV from Raycom Media and sell WRLH to the previously unknown Carma Broadcasting. Raycom had recently bought Lincoln Financial Media's three television stations, including NBC affiliate WWBT, and put WTVR on the market because FCC rules do not allow duopolies between two of the four largest stations in a market. However, Sinclair was to provide "sales and other non-programming related services" to WRLH after the sale was finalized. This could be seen by some as an attempt by Sinclair to sell WRLH to a shell corporation used for the purpose of circumventing FCC ownership rules, much as Sinclair has done for years with Cunningham Broadcasting.

In August 2008, the United States Department of Justice, under provisions of a consent decree with Raycom Media entered into as part of the Lincoln Financial Media deal, denied the company permission to sell WTVR to Sinclair. As a result, Raycom sought and was eventually granted a temporary waiver to keep both WTVR and WWBT until it could find a buyer for WTVR, which was eventually swapped to Local TV for WBRC in Birmingham, Alabama.

Nullified sale to Standard Media
On May 8, 2017, Sinclair entered into an agreement to acquire Chicago-based Tribune Media – which has owned WTVR since December 2013 – for $3.9 billion, plus the assumption of $2.7 billion in debt held by Tribune. Because Sinclair and Tribune each owned two television stations in the Richmond market, with WTVR and WRLH both ranking among the market's four highest-rated stations in total day viewership, the companies were required to sell one of the two outlets to an independently operated station owner in order to comply with FCC local ownership rules. On April 24, 2018, in an amendment to the Tribune acquisition through which it proposed the sale of certain stations to both independent and affiliated third-party companies to curry the DOJ's approval, Sinclair announced that it would sell WRLH-TV and eight other stations – Sinclair-operated KOKH-TV in Oklahoma City, KDSM-TV in Des Moines, WOLF-TV (along with LMA partners WSWB and WQMY) in Scranton/Wilkes-Barre and WXLV-TV in Greensboro/Winston-Salem/High Point, and Tribune-owned WPMT in Harrisburg and WXMI in Grand Rapids – to Standard Media Group (an independent broadcast holding company formed by private equity firm Standard General to assume ownership of and absolve ownership conflicts involving the aforementioned stations) for $441.1 million. The transaction includes a transitional services agreement, through which Sinclair would have continued operating WRLH for six months after the sale's completion.

Less than one month after the FCC voted to have the deal reviewed by an administrative law judge amid "serious concerns" about Sinclair's forthrightness in its applications to sell certain conflict properties, on August 9, 2018, Tribune announced it would terminate the Sinclair deal, intending to seek other M&A opportunities. Tribune also filed a breach of contract lawsuit in the Delaware Chancery Court, alleging that Sinclair engaged in protracted negotiations with the FCC and the DOJ over regulatory issues, refused to sell stations in markets where it already had properties, and proposed divestitures to parties with ties to Sinclair executive chair David D. Smith that were rejected or highly subject to rejection to maintain control over stations it was required to sell. The termination of the Sinclair sale agreement effectively nullified the sale of WRLH-TV to Standard, leaving it among Sinclair's few 'orphan' stations (that is, a Fox, CW or MyNetworkTV station without a non-subchannel sister station in the same market).

WRLH-DT2
WRLH-DT2, branded on-air as MyTV Richmond, is the MyNetworkTV-affiliated second digital subchannel of WRLH-TV, broadcasting in widescreen standard definition on UHF channel 26.2 (or virtual channel 35.2). Outside of weeknight prime time, WRLH-DT2 airs TBD.

History
The subchannel's origins began on January 24, 2006, when UPN and The WB announced that the networks would cease broadcasting and merge. The new combined network would be called The CW. The letters would represent the first initial of corporate parents CBS (the parent company of UPN) and the Warner Bros. unit of Time Warner. On February 22, News Corporation announced that it would start up another new network called MyNetworkTV. This new network, which would be sister to Fox, would be operated by Fox Television Stations and its syndication division Twentieth Television.

MyNetworkTV was created to give UPN and WB stations, not mentioned as becoming CW affiliates, another option besides becoming independent and compete against The CW. UPN was offered in Richmond on WUPV-TV while NBC affiliate WWBT carried The WB out of rotation in late-night since there was no full-time affiliate with the network. During that time, WRLH aired Kids' WB.

The main channel established this second digital subchannel in order to air MyNetworkTV when the network launched on September 5. MGM and Weigel Broadcasting launched This TV in November 2008. WRLH-DT2 became one of its launch-day affiliates. At one point every night at midnight, the station re-aired the main channel's nightly prime time newscast (Fox News at 10) produced by WWBT. The newscast returned in June 2012 and was simulcast after MyNetworkTV's prime time programming, but as of April 2013, it was quietly removed from the schedule.

Programming
Syndicated programming on WRLH (as of September 2022) includes Live with Kelly and Ryan, Maury, The Steve Wilkos Show, Judge Judy, Family Feud, The Big Bang Theory, Young Sheldon, 25 Words or Less, Sherri and Karamo, among others. Syndicated programming on WRLH-DT2 includes The Simpsons, Family Guy and Bob's Burgers. The three programs air in a two-hour block on weekday evenings between TBD and MyNetworkTV programming.

On March 14, 2008, the Virginia High School League championship basketball tournament was televised for the first time by WRLH and other Virginia television stations.

Newscasts

On September 19, 1994, NBC affiliate WWBT (then owned by the Jefferson-Pilot Corporation) entered into a news share agreement with WRLH. This resulted in a nightly prime time newscast being launched on WRLH known as Fox News at 10. On January 8, 2001, the weeknight broadcast was expanded to an hour. This made it the only station in the area to have a late-night hour-long news show. Friday nights at 10:45, there is a fifteen-minute sports highlight show that airs known as Fox First Sports.

WWBT became the first television station in the market to transition local news to high definition level on July 27, 2008. The nightly Fox News at 10 broadcast, however, remained in pillarboxed 4:3 standard definition for over four years because WRLH lacked a high definition-capable master control at its separate studios in order to receive the newscast in HD. In September 2012, WRLH underwent a master control upgrade so that the WWBT newscasts and some syndicated programming could now be received and transmitted in HD. This station did not face any competition to the prime time newscast until March 5, 2007, when WUPV launched a 35-minute weeknight newscast at 10 produced by WTVR. Thirty minute weekend shows on the latter outlet began October 20, 2007, and ended almost a year later on October 19.

The final weeknight newscast was November 7, and three days later, WUPV announced the agreement with WTVR had been canceled due to high financial costs producing the shows. On January 16, 2012, WRLH launched an hour-long extension of WWBT's weekday morning news. The production is known as Fox Richmond Morning News and can be seen from 7 to 8 airing against the first hour of national morning programs on Richmond's Big Three affiliates.

The WWBT-produced newscasts on WRLH feature the same music package and graphics theme used on other Sinclair-owned stations with news departments.

Technical information

Subchannels
The station's digital signal is multiplexed: 

WRLH-DT2, a digital subchannel that carries MyNetworkTV, added This TV on day one. On September 1, 2012, Sinclair Broadcast Group dropped music network TheCoolTV from its stations, including WRLH-DT3. WRLH was a launch affiliate for all three of Sinclair's digital networks. Comet launched on WRLH-DT3 in October 2015. In March 2017, TBD replaced This TV on WRLH-DT2, and Charge! launched on WRLH-DT4.

On April 11, 2022, WRLH-TV began hosting WUPV's 65.3 subchannel, as a result of WUPV converting to ATSC 3.0; in turn, WUPV simulcasts WRLH-TV in the ATSC 3.0 broadcast standard.

Analog-to-digital conversion
WRLH-TV shut down its analog signal, over UHF channel 35, at 11:59 p.m. on February 17, 2009, the original target date in which full-power television stations in the United States were to transition from analog to digital broadcasts under federal mandate (which was later pushed back to June 12, 2009). The station's digital signal remained on its pre-transition UHF channel 26. Through the use of PSIP, digital television receivers display the station's virtual channel as its former UHF analog channel 35.

It was the only station in the Richmond market that ended analog broadcasting before the new date of June 12. WRLH did provide "nightlight" analog service for thirty days after.

References

External links
FoxRichmond.com - WRLH-TV official website 
MyTVRichmond.com - MyNetworkTV Richmond official website

Fox network affiliates
Comet (TV network) affiliates
Charge! (TV network) affiliates
Dabl affiliates
Sinclair Broadcast Group
RLH-TV
Television channels and stations established in 1982
1982 establishments in Virginia